Salvia macrostachya is a rare herb native to Ecuador and southern Colombia, with no specific information about its native habitat.

Notes

macrostachya
Flora of Ecuador
Flora of Colombia